Brendan Edwards (18 March 1936 – 10 May 2021) was an Australian rules footballer who played for the Hawthorn Football Club in the Victorian Football League (VFL) from 1956 to 1961 and again in the 1963 season.

VFL career

Edwards was recruited for the Bendigo team of Sandhurst like his teammate Graham Arthur. He was a Physical Education schoolteacher when he was selected to make his debut in 1956. It was soon apparent that Edwards was a fitness fanatic and believed like his captain, John Kennedy that footballers were not fit enough. During the 1959 season, Edwards convinced Hawthorn coach Jack Hale to adopt circuit training for the entire team. 

Edwards won the Hawthorn best and fairest award in 1960 and represented Victoria at interstate football in the same season.  The following year he was voted best on ground in Hawthorn premiership win against Footscray in the 1961 VFL Grand Final. He took a year off football to concentrate on his gymnasium business. He returned to play in 1963 but only lasted nine games before rupturing his ACL against Richmond.  He retired as a player and he put his energies into a chain of health clubs in Melbourne and pioneered the concept of aerobic fitness in Australia.

He was awarded life membership of the Hawthorn Football Club in 1970, and named in their team of the century in 2001. In 2011 he was inducted into the Hawthorn Hall of Fame.

Honours and achievements
Hawthorn
 VFL premiership player: 1961
 2× Minor premiership: 1961, 1963

Individual
 Hawthorn best and fairest: 1960
 Hawthorn Hall of Fame
 Hawthorn life member

See also
 Australian football at the 1956 Summer Olympics

References

External links

Australian rules footballers from Victoria (Australia)
Hawthorn Football Club players
Hawthorn Football Club Premiership players
Peter Crimmins Medal winners
Sandhurst Football Club players
1936 births
Australian footballers at the 1956 Summer Olympics
One-time VFL/AFL Premiership players

2021 deaths